The Battle of Süntel  was a land battle that took place between Saxon rebels led by Widukind and a detachment of Frankish forces led by envoys of Charlemagne named Adalgis, Geilo, and Worad at Süntel in 782 during the Saxon Wars. The result was a victory for the Saxons, resulting in the deaths of Adalgis, Geilo, four counts, and 20 other noblemen. Shortly following the loss, Charlemagne had 4,500 rebels beheaded on a single day, in an event sometimes known as the Verden Massacre.

References

Sources
Cosack, E. Der altsächsische "Heidenkirchhof" bei Sarstedt, Ldkr. Hildesheim, und die Schlacht am Süntel 782, 2007.
Heimbs, G. Die Amelungsburg am Süntel und die Schlacht vom Jahre 782; In: Die Kunde 12, 1944.
Royal Frankish Annals, in Scholz, B. W. (ed.), Carolingian Chronicles (Ann Arbor, 1970), pp. 37– 125.

Suntel
Suntel
Charlemagne
782
Süntel
8th century in Francia
Süntel